Alexandre-Évariste Coccinelle Fragonard (26 October 1780 – 10 November 1850) was a French painter and sculptor in the troubadour style. He received his first training from his father and drew from him his piquant subjects and great facility, perfecting them under Jacques-Louis David. His parents were Jean-Honoré Fragonard and Marie-Anne Fragonard.

He was born in Grasse, and died in Paris.

Works

His paintings include :
 Francis I Armed as a Knight
 Francis I Receiving Primaticcio (ceiling of the Louvre)
 Joan of Arc Climbing to the Stake
 Tasso Reading Jerusalem Delivered
 Francis I at Marignan
 Mirabeau Replying to Dreux-Brézé

As a sculptor, he produced the old pediment of the Chambre des Députés and a colossal statue of Pichegru.

Designed an engraving called the, Interior of a Revolutionary Committee under the Terror, which was engraved by Pierre-Gabriel Berthault and Claude Nicolas Malapeau in 1802.

References

Notes

Sources
Dictionnaire Bouillet (Bouillet dictionary)

External links
 
 Alexandre-Évariste Fragonard short biography in ART “4” “2”-DAY
 Alexandre-Évariste Fragonard on Artcyclopedia

1780 births
1850 deaths
People from Grasse
18th-century French painters
French male painters
19th-century French painters
Pupils of Jacques-Louis David
19th-century French sculptors
French male sculptors
19th-century male artists
18th-century French male artists